Patiala School for the Deaf-blind is a special school for deaf-blind children, or multiple disabilities, in Patiala city of Panjab. Society for Welfare of the Handicapped started the school in 2011.

The school is the 3rd of its kind in India.

See also 
 Mahant Gurbanta Das School for Deaf & Dumb, Bathinda
 Vatika High School for Deaf & Dumb, Chandigarh
 Patiala School for the Deaf
 Patiala School for the Blind
 Umeed Red Cross School for Hearing Impaired, Faridkot
 Khosla School for the Deaf, Jalandhar
 School for Deaf, Barnala

References 

Schools for the deaf in Punjab
Schools for the blind in Punjab
Educational institutions established in 2011
2011 establishments in Punjab, India